You Hao (born April 26, 1992) is a Chinese artistic gymnast. He competed for the Chinese national team at the World Artistic Gymnastics Championships in 2013, 2014 and 2015. He became the World Champion on parallel bars at the 2015 World Championships.

You competed for China at the 2016 Summer Olympics.

World Championships

You made his senior debut at world level at the 2013 World Artistic Gymnastics Championships in Antwerp, where he finished fourth on parallel bars with a score of 15.500.

At the 2014 World Artistic Gymnastics Championships in Nanning, China, You contributed to the team's first-place finish in parallel bars. Individually, he tied with Denis Ablyazin to win a bronze medal on rings with a score of 15.700.

In 2015, You competed at the 2015 World Artistic Gymnastics Championships in Glasgow. In the team final, You competed again on pommel horse (14.666), rings (15.633) and parallel bars (15.933), contributing to the Chinese team's third-place finish behind Japan and Great Britain. In the event finals, You claimed the world champion title on parallel bars, scoring a massive 16.216, the highest score on this apparatus throughout the whole competition. This was also the only gold medal won by the Chinese men's team at this World Championship. He also won a silver medal on rings behind Greek Eleftherios Petrounias, with a score of 15.733.

References

External links
 
 
 

1992 births
Living people
Medalists at the World Artistic Gymnastics Championships
Chinese male artistic gymnasts
Olympic gymnasts of China
Olympic medalists in gymnastics
Gymnasts at the 2016 Summer Olympics
2016 Olympic bronze medalists for China
Sportspeople from Xuzhou
Gymnasts from Jiangsu
Gymnasts at the 2020 Summer Olympics
Medalists at the 2020 Summer Olympics
Olympic silver medalists for China
21st-century Chinese people